Football Club Bunyodkor is an Uzbek professional football club based in Tashkent that competes in the Uzbekistan Super League.

Bunyodkor, a relatively unknown club at the time, made international headlines when it claimed to be close to signing world-famous Barcelona striker Samuel Eto'o, although he did not sign with them. On 25 August 2008, AEK Athens Brazilian superstar Rivaldo announced to the Greek press that he was joining Bunyodkor on a reported $14 million two-year contract.

The club finished second in the 2007 Uzbek League season and made the semi-finals of the 2008 AFC Champions League. In the beginning of August 2008, the club changed its name to Bunyodkor from PFC Kuruvchi to reflect the club's success on the pitch and its increasing professionalism off the pitch.

Bunyodkor is the second best team of AFC Champions League's history after Pakhtakor by participating in 10 consecutive tournaments of Champions League from 2008 to 2017.

History

Bunyodkor, which means "creator" in Uzbek (and originally from the Persian بنیادکار|bonyad-Kar), was created on 6 July 2005, with the name Neftgazmontaj-Quruvchi, which was typically abbreviated "Kuruvchi" (the Uzbek word for "builder"). In 2005, the club played initially in the championship of Tashkent region and played its way into the playoff for promotion into the First League, the second level of Uzbek football. Kuruvchi gained promotion that year, its first, and under the management of Khikmat Irgashev, Kuruvchi won the First League in its first attempt, winning 27 of 38 matches with 5 draws and 6 defeats.

With its victory in the second level of Uzbek football in 2006, the 2007 season was Kuruvchi's debut in the Uzbek League. Never before had a club moved with such alacrity from the lower reaches of Uzbek competition into the top league. In club's first season Bunyodkor finished runner-up after Pakhtakor Tashkent.

In December 2007 Mirjalol Kasymov was appointed as head coach of Bunyodkor, replacing Hikmat Irgashev.

2008 was debut year of Bunyodkor in AFC Champions League where they qualified to the semi-final of tournament. In semi-final they were beaten over two legs by Adelaide United 3–1 on aggregate.

Famous signings

On 14 July 2008, the club, then called Kuruvchi, announced through their official website that they had signed Barcelona star Samuel Eto'o on a six-month contract. The story was confirmed by Bakhtiyor Babaev, the club's sporting director, stating that it was a performance-related contract. He also went on to say that the Cameroonian football star would sign on 17 July, and that the transfer had taken place due to the good relationship enjoyed between both clubs' presidents. Despite this, Barcelona official spokesperson denied any knowledge of the transfer, stating "I don't think it's very likely".

On 16 July 2008, the Uzbek radio Maxima reported that Davut Kivrak and Barcelona managers are expected to arrive in Tashkent to hold talks with the Uzbek Football Federation and to promote youth football (Barcelona and Bunyodkor have a yearly renewable deal to help in youth football). The following day, Eto'o confirmed that he was thinking of joining Kuruvchi – the team stated that they would have confirmation on whether Eto'o would join the team on 23 July 2008.

Shortly thereafter, Bunyodkor and Barcelona managements announced that the two clubs had reached an agreement to play a friendly in Tashkent and the Uzbek side will be able to train at Camp Nou.

As of 31 July 2008, Eto'o's status had become no clearer, as Bunyodkor was still in the running to obtain the services of the Cameroonian international, but he was also being sought by Milanese powerhouses A.C. Milan and Internazionale.

Just a couple of days after Eto'o's visit to Tashkent, two other players from Barcelona visited the team – Andrés Iniesta and Carles Puyol, as well as Arsenal midfielder Cesc Fàbregas.

Although unsuccessful in obtaining Eto'o's services by September 2008, Bunyodkor brought two famous Brazilians to Tashkent: Rivaldo as a midfielder and Zico as manager. Rivaldo signed a contract that he termed "very good for the end of my career" to play for Bunyodkor. Three weeks later, his countryman Zico signed on to manage the club on a one-year deal.
 Mirjalol Qosimov became adviser-coach to Brazilian Zico. On 17 November 2008 Rivaldo extended his contract with club until December 2011.

Zico left Bunyodkor in January 2009 after he was signed by PFC CSKA Moscow as head coach. On 8 June 2009 Luiz Felipe Scolari was announced as Bunyodkor's new head coach. In 2010 AFC Champions League, Bunyodkor failed to reach the quarter-final after losing on 12 May 2010 in Round of 16 to Al-Hilal FC 3–0. Scolari resigned from his post on 28 May 2010 and Mirjalol Qosimov was named as his successor. Qosimov became head coach of Bunyodkor again. Also Rivaldo unexpectedly terminated his multi-million contract and was released from the club on 12 August 2010.

2011–present

On 26 February 2011 Bunyodkor unveiled 11 new players for the 2011 season.

In the 2012 season, Bunyodkor was unable to defend its league title, despite winning its third Uzbek Cup; the club finished runner-up to Pakhtakor in the league. In the 2012 AFC Champions League, the club repeated its 2008 achievements, reaching the semi-final of the tournament. In the semi-final, Bunyodkor lost to Ulsan Hyundai over two legs.

Bunyodkor made play-off of AFC Champions League for the 6th successive season in 2013, winning the group stage of tournament. The club renewed its own previous record and record of AFC Champions League history. On 7 March 2014 Bunyodkor won Lokomotiv Tashkent with 2:1 in Uzbekistan Super Cup match, match between League champion and Uzbek Cup winner. The Super Cup was held for the second time since 1999.

On 6 June 2014, Sergey Lushan succeeded Mirjalol Kasymov to become the manager of Bunyodkor after Kasymov resigned his post at club in April 2014. During his time as head coach in club Lushan brought many talents from Bunyodkor academy to main squad. 2014 season club finished only 4th after Nasaf Qarshi. In 2015 AFC Champions League group stage Bunyodkor failed to qualify to play-off for the first time. After match Neftchi Farg'ona- Bunyodkor on 20 September 2015 he resigned his post on 23 September.

On 5 May 2017, Sergey Lushan was sacked, with Mirjalol Qosimov being appointed as the club's new manager the same day.

On 12 January 2019, Vadim Abramov was appointed as manager of Bunyodkor.

Competitions history

Domestic

Continental

AFC ranking
.

Stadium

Bunyodkor played its first years at the MHSK Stadium. After the end of the Uzbek League season 2008 it was announced that MHSK stadium would have been closed for longtime reconstruction. Season 2008 was the last season at the MHSK stadium, for 2009 season club moved to 8,460-seater JAR Stadium. The old MHSK Stadium was completely demolished, with plans to build a new 34,000 all-seater Bunyodkor (Milliy) Stadium and football academy. The construction works were finished in August 2012.

The stadium was opened on 28 September 2012 and originally was one of the proposed venues to host the matches of FIFA U-20 Women's World Cup 2012 in Uzbekistan. The festive opening ceremony of the stadium marking the 100th anniversary of football in Uzbekistan was held on 28 September 2012 with an exhibition match between Bunyodkor and Pakhtakor with the scoreline ending 3:3.

The first official football match was played on 26 March 2013. The 2014 FIFA World Cup AFC qualifying round 4 match between Uzbekistan and Lebanon ended with a 1–0.

Records and statistics

Anvar Gafurov presently holds the team record for number of matches played for the club. He made 232 appearances ahead of Hayrulla Karimov with 224 caps (4 December 2017)

Bunyodkor's all-time top goalscorers in all competitions is Anvar Soliev with 65 goals, 46 of them in league matches, 2nd is Rivaldo with 43 goals followed by Viktor Karpenko with 39 goals.

Top goalscorers

Kit manufacturers and shirt sponsors
The current main shirt sponsor of Bunyodkor is the state natural gas transport company "Uztransgaz". Uztransgaz became largest shareholder of Bunyodkor in March 2011 and head club sponsor. Bunyodkors shirts had been made by manufacturer Nike until 2012. In March 2012 club announced Jako as the club's new kit manufacturer, extending the deal in December 2017.

Capital derby
Since Bunyodkor's promotion to the Uzbek League matches between club and their other rival from capital, football powerhouse Pakhtakor, considered by supporters of both sides and football journalists as Uzbek capital derby or Toshkent derby. With former coach Luiz Felipe Scolari Bunyodkor faced four derby matches: three Uzbek League and one Uzbekistan Cup matches. His first derby match took place on 12 July 2009 at JAR Stadium where Bunyodkor won against Pakhtakor with 2:1. The Supercup match between the champion and the Cup winner originally scheduled for 11 March 2012 was postponed. The new date for the game was officially not announced.

On 26 June 2012, in League match Bunyodkor won Pakhtakor for the second time with two goal difference (2:0). In semi-final 2nd leg match of Uzbekistan Cup on 25 November 2012, Bunyodkor won Pakhtakor with 3:1 for the second time, qualifying to cup final.
On 30 June 2013 Bunyodkor played away League match won with 2:0. This defeat was Pakhtakor's first home match loss in Uzbek League against Bunyodkor.

In the second leg of 2013 League season on 8 August 2013 Bunyodkor faced Pakhtakor at home JAR ground and lost against the Lions with 1:2. The loss was Bunyodkor's first since 2009 Cup match and first ever in League matches.

Match statistics
Statistics as of 8 December 2022

Derby all-time top scorers

Players

Current squad

Out on loan

Reserves squad

Notable players
Had international caps for their respective countries. Players whose name is listed in bold represented their countries while playing for Bunyodkor.

Former players

Uzbekistan
 Server Djeparov
 Jovlon Ibrokhimov
 Akmal Shorakhmedov
 Hayrulla Karimov
 Sardor Rashidov
 Artyom Filiposyan
 Jasur Hasanov
 Anvar Gafurov
 Timur Kapadze
 Ignatiy Nesterov
 Kamoliddin Murzoev
 Pavel Bugalo
 Anzur Ismailov
 Pavel Bugalo
 Anvarjon Soliev
 Yannis Mandzukas
 Victor Karpenko
 Azizbek Haydarov

Former USSR countries
 Odilzhon Abdurakhmanov
 Emil Kenzhesariev
  Vadim Cemirtan
  Pavel Mogilevets
  Davron Ergashev
  Selim Nurmyradow
  Goçguly Goçgulyýew
  Serhiy Symonenko

Europe
 Samir Bekrić
 Jurica Buljat
  Carles Coto
  Stevica Ristić
  Filip Rajevac
  Dušan Mićić
 Marko Blažić
 Ivan Milošević
  Aleksandar Alempijević
 Miloš Trifunović
 Uroš Milosavljević
 Slavoljub Đorđević
  Saša Đorđević
  Jan Kozak

South America
  Rivaldo
  Denilson
  Edson Ramos Silva
  Joao Victor
  Leomar Rodrigues
  Luizão
 José Luis Villanueva

Africa
  Patrick Agbo
 David Oniya
  Chaker Zouaghi

Asia
  David Carney
  Sato Minori

Current technical staff

Managerial history
. Only competitive matches are counted.

Notes:

Honours

Uzbekistan 
 Uzbekistan Super League:
  Winners (5): 2008, 2009, 2010, 2011, 2013
  Runners-up (3): 2007, 2012, 2016
 Uzbekistan Cup:
  Winners (4): 2008, 2010, 2012, 2013
  Runners-up (5): 2007, 2009, 2014, 2015, 2017
Uzbekistan Super Cup:
  Winners (1): 2014
 Uzbekistan First League:
  Winners (1): 2006
 Uzbekistan Second League:
  Winners (1): 2005
 Tashkent Region Championship:
  Winners (1): 2005

International 
 Matchworld Cup:
  Third place (1): 2012
 AFC Champions League:
 Semi-final (2): 2008, 2012

References

External links

 Official website 
 Weltfussballarchiv

 
Football clubs in Uzbekistan
Association football clubs established in 2005
2005 establishments in Uzbekistan
Sport in Tashkent